Harmu Housing Colony is one of the largest residential areas of Ranchi, the capital of Jharkhand state, India. The Colony was established during the early 1960s, and has since rapidly expanded. As of 2016, it has, apart from residential houses and apartments, a number of trading and commercial establishments; government offices; schools and hospitals, and other civic facilities. The neighboring areas of Harmu housing Colony are Argora and Ashok Nagar in South, Kishore Gunj in North and New AG Cooperative colony in East. India cricket captain MS Dhoni's house is located here. Many high rise apartments are being built in this area and property prices are very high.

See also 

 List of Neighbourhoods of Ranchi

References

External links 

Neighbourhoods in Ranchi